Bowling Industry Online is a monthly ten-pin bowling magazine published by B2B Media Inc. The magazine was established in 1993. It has its headquarters in Studio City, California.

References

External links

Monthly magazines published in the United States
Sports magazines published in the United States
Magazines established in 1993
Magazines published in California
Ten-pin bowling magazines
Professional and trade magazines